Celandine is a children's fantasy novel by Steve Augarde. It is the second book in the Touchstone Trilogy and was first published in 2006. Celandine is set ninety years before The Various, the first book of the trilogy. It follows the adventures of Celandine (born 1901) in the years 1914–1915, at the onset of World War I. Having run away from her detested boarding school, Celandine is too afraid to go home in case she is sent back. As she seeks shelter in the Wild Wood near her home, little does she think she will encounter a world where loyalty and independence is fiercely guarded, and where danger lurks in the most unlikely of places. Celandine's troubled character finds both refuge and purpose among the secret tribes of little people that she alone believes in.

Plot summary
The book starts out with Celandine running away from the boarding school she was sent to by her parents to ‘pound all of the nonsense out of her’. It is her third escape attempt, after being sent back twice by her parents. She boards a train and meets a crippled soldier who appears to be no older than her brother Freddie, who died as a volunteer soldier. She aids him in lighting his cigarette. She also meets a nurse who upon Celandine's departure from their company exclaims “Do you know that extraordinary looking girl?”

She returns to her home farm but does not enter not wishing for an angry confrontation with her father. She climbs the hill and hoots; a signal apparently. A small child Celandine calls Fin appears out of nowhere and jumps her; smothering her with love and affection, begging for cake. This is where the back-story begins.

Celandine was 10 when she first saw the “little people”. She was resting under a tree where Fin finds her, soon followed by his Father/Guardian. Upon her return to her normal surroundings no one except Freddie believes her when she tells them what she saw.

[The above comprises the first 1½ chapters.]

The Name Celandine
Celandine is named after a flowering medicinal herb. It may either be Greater celandine of the poppy family, or Lesser celandine, a buttercup. The plant figures in all three volumes of the trilogy, but it is not clear from the descriptions which of the two Steve Augarde has in mind.

Characters
Celandine Howard, who is the main character of book and heroine. She is mischievous and trouble loving, much to the distress of her parents and governess. Growing up rich, she is slightly spoiled and selfish, but her heart is tender. She has light colored, wild hair, but  dark solemn eyes and eyebrows.
Freddie (Wyndham Frederick) Howard, who is Celandine's older by three years and favorite brother. He is sensitive and unselfish but unendingly brave. He loves a good adventure and was the one to suggest searching for the mysterious “small people” that Celandine saw in the trees. He also adores Celandine. He has light frizzy hair that would be like Celandine's if allowed to grow out; and light-colored eyes.
Thos (Thomas) Howard, who is Celandine's serious older by five years brother. He is quick tempered like his father. Dark eyes and hair.

Printed Editions
UK
 Hardcover: Celandine, David Fickling Books 2005, 
 Paperback: Celandine, Corgi 2006, 
US
 Hardcover: Celandine, David Fickling Books 2006, 
 Paperback: Celandine, Yearling Books 2006,

Translations
France
 Paperback: Celandine, trans. Jean Esch, Editions Albin Michel 2012, 
Germany
 Hardcover: Der Elfenwald, trans. Ursula Höfker, Arena Verlag 2006, 
 Paperback: Der Elfenwald, trans. Ursula Höfker, Arena Verlag 2009, 
 Paperback: Der Elfenwald, trans. Ursula Höfker, Arena Verlag 2011,

References

2006 British novels
2006 fantasy novels
Children's fantasy novels
Young adult fantasy novels
British bildungsromans
British children's novels
British fantasy novels
Novels set in Somerset
Fiction set in 1914
Fiction set in 1915
2006 children's books
David Fickling Books books